Cyclophora sanguinata is a moth in the  family Geometridae. It is found in South Africa.

References

Endemic moths of South Africa
Moths described in 1904
Cyclophora (moth)
Moths of Africa